The Red Forest is the  area surrounding the Chernobyl Nuclear Power Plant within the Exclusion Zone, located in Polesia. The name "Red Forest" comes from the ginger-brown colour of the pine trees after they died following the absorption of high levels of ionizing radiation as a consequence of the Chernobyl nuclear disaster on 26 April 1986. In the post-disaster cleanup operations, the Red Forest was bulldozed and buried in "waste graveyards"; the site remains one of the most contaminated areas in the world today.

Disaster and cleanup

The Red Forest is located in the zone of alienation; this area received the highest doses of radiation from the Chernobyl disaster and the resulting clouds of smoke and dust, heavily polluted with radioactive contamination. The trees died from this radiation. The explosion and fire at the Chernobyl No. 4 reactor contaminated the soil, water and atmosphere with radioactive material equivalent to that of 20 times the atomic bombings of Hiroshima and Nagasaki.

In the post-disaster cleanup operations, a majority of the pine trees were bulldozed and buried in trenches by the "liquidators". The trenches were then covered with a thick carpet of sand and planted with pine saplings. Many fear that as the trees decay, radioactive contaminants will leach into the ground water. People have evacuated the contaminated zone around the Red Forest.

Wildlife refuge

As humans were evacuated from the area in 1986, animals moved in despite the radiation. The flora and fauna of the Red Forest have been dramatically affected by the accident. It seems that the biodiversity of the Red Forest has increased in the years following the disaster. There are reports of some stunted plants in the area. Wild boar multiplied eightfold between 1986 and 1988.

The site of the Red Forest remains one of the most contaminated areas in the world. However, it has proved to be an astonishingly fertile habitat for many endangered species. The evacuation of the area surrounding the nuclear reactor has created a lush and unique wildlife refuge. In the 1996 BBC Horizon documentary "Inside Chernobyl's Sarcophagus", birds are seen flying in and out of large holes in the structure of the former nuclear reactor. The long-term impact of the fallout on the flora and fauna of the region is not fully known, as plants and animals have significantly different and varying radiologic tolerance. Some birds are reported with stunted tail feathers (which interferes with breeding). Storks, wolves, beavers, deer, and eagles have been reported in the area.

In 2005, radiation levels in the Red Forest were in some places as high as 10 mSv/h. More than 90% of the radioactivity of the Red Forest was concentrated in the soil.

The nature of the area seems to have not only survived, but flourished due to significant reduction of human impact. The zone has become a "Radiological Reserve", a classic example of an involuntary park. Currently, there is concern about contamination of the soil with strontium-90 and caesium-137, which have half-lives of about 30 years. The highest levels of caesium-137 are found in the surface layers of the soil where they are absorbed by plants, and insects living there today. Some scientists fear that radioactivity will affect the land for the next several generations.

Wildfires
In April 2015, a large forest fire burning nearly  came within  of the abandoned nuclear power plant, raising fears the flames would burn shrub and woodland surrounding the disaster zone, which could have released radioactive material into the atmosphere. The forest was ravaged again by another wildfire in April 2020 that caused an unknown amount of damage.

A study published in 2014 found that plant matter - leaf litter and trunks of dead trees in the Red Forest area decays at a far slower rate than is typical for forest detritus. The researchers found that microorganisms responsible for decomposing forest litter do not act on such matter within the contaminated zone at nearly the rate seen in forests outside the zone. As a result, the amount of detritus - the major fuel of wildfires - is significantly larger than in other forests. Fire risks are therefore elevated compared with those in other forests with similar climatic conditions.

Human activity
In February 2022, during the Russian invasion of Ukraine, Russian forces reportedly moved vehicles through the Red Forest, using it as a route for their convoys, which kicked up clouds of radioactive dust from the forest. Local workers reported the Russian troops moving through the Red Forest were not using protective suits and could have potentially endangered themselves. On 31 March 2022, it was reported that most of the Russian troops occupying Chernobyl were forced to pull back after suffering from radiation sickness caused by digging trenches in the heavily contaminated Red Forest. There has not been independent confirmation that the pull-back was caused by radiation sickness, but Ukrainian officials have provided access to the site which shows considerable trenches and digging in the Red Forest.

On 1 April 2022, The Daily Telegraph reported that one Russian soldier died from acute radiation sickness after being camped in the Red Forest for a prolonged time. In October, CNN reported that injured Russian soldiers who operated in Chernobyl had been treated at the Republican Research Center for Radiation Medicine and Human Ecology in Belarus, including some who showed signs of radiation poisoning.

See also

Bellesrad
Chernobyl liquidators
Comparison of Chernobyl and other radioactivity releases
Effects of the Chernobyl disaster
List of civilian nuclear accidents
List of individual trees
List of Chernobyl-related articles
Nuclear and radiation accidents and incidents
Zone of alienation
Zone Rouge

References in fiction

The 2004 novel "Wolves Eat Dogs" by Martin Cruz Smith, in the series featuring the Russian police inspector Arkady Renko, is partly set in the Red Forest near Chernobyl. https://en.wikipedia.org/wiki/Wolves_Eat_Dogs

References

External links
Description of Red Forest - unique ecosystem of Chernobyl zone of alienation. (radiation dead forest ecosystem) 
Greenpeace ten-year retrospective
The Zone as a wildlife reserve
More images from inside the Zone
 25 years of satellite imagery over Chernobyl

Chernobyl Exclusion Zone
Forests of Ukraine
Pripyat
Geography of Kyiv Oblast
Radiation effects